Blaž Mohar (born 21 April 1989 in Ljubljana) is a Slovenian football midfielder who plays for Dob in Slovenian Second League. In July 2015, he changed to Austria and plays for SK Kühnsdorf in the Kärntner Liga (League for Carinthia, 4th division in Austria).

External links
NZS profile 

1989 births
Living people
Footballers from Ljubljana
Slovenian footballers
Association football midfielders
NK Domžale players
NK Dob players
Slovenian PrvaLiga players
Slovenian Second League players